Copelatus aphroditae is a species of diving beetle. It is part of the genus Copelatus of the subfamily Copelatinae in the family Dytiscidae. It was described by Balke in 2003.

References

aphroditae
Beetles described in 2003